NGC 7499 is an unbarred lenticular galaxy within the constellation Pisces. NGC 7499 is its New General Catalogue designation. It was discovered on September 2, 1864 by the astronomer Albert Marth.

In 1986, a supernova was discovered within NGC 7499 and was subsequently designated SN 1986M.

External links

References 

Pisces (constellation)
Unbarred lenticular galaxies
7499